Mohammadabad (also Romanized as Moḩammadābād) is a village in Anzan-e Sharqi Rural District, in the Central District of Bandar-e Gaz County, Golestan Province, Iran. At the 2006 census, its population was 237, in 53 families.

References 

Populated places in Bandar-e Gaz County